CJTL-FM, is a Canadian radio station, that broadcasts a First Nations and Christian radio programming at 96.5 FM in Pickle Lake, Ontario, along with a radio translator CJTL-FM-1 at 98.1 FM in Thunder Bay.

Licensed in 2008, the station is owned by the Native Evangelical Fellowship of Canada and broadcasts as the Wah-Ste-Win Aboriginal Radio Network (WARN), which broadcasts Christian programming for First Nations in Northwestern Ontario. WARN has plans to open a third transmitter in Winnipeg, pending CRTC approval and licensing.

References

External links
 Native Evangelical Fellowship of Canada: WARN official site
 
 

Jtl
Jtl
Jtl
Cree language
Oji-Cree
Radio stations established in 2008
2008 establishments in Ontario